This is a list of higher educational institutions in Tripura, an Indian state.

Universities
 ICFAI University, Tripura
 Maharaja Bir Bikram University
 Tripura University

Engineering and Polytechnic Institutes
National Institute of Technology Agartala
 Dhalai District Polytechnic
 Gomati District Polytechnic
 North Tripura District Polytechnic
 TTAADC Polytechnic Institute, Khumulwng
 Women's Polytechnic
 National Institute of Electronics & Information Technology
 Techno India, Agartala
 Tripura Institute of Technology
 Indian Institute of Information Technology Agartala

Medical and Paramedical Institutes
 Agartala Government Medical College
 Tripura Medical College
 College of Veterinary Sciences and Animal Husbandry
 Tripura Institute of Paramedical Sciences
 Tripura College of Nursing
 Institute of Nursing Science

Other Professional Degree Institutes
 College of Agriculture, Tripura
 College of Fisheries, Tripura
 Regional Institute of Pharmaceutical Science and Technology
 Regional College of Physical Education
 Tripura Government Law College
 Institute of Advance Studies in Education
 College of Teacher Education, Kumarghat
 Bhavan’s Tripura College of Teacher Education
 Holy Cross College of Teacher Education
 Sachin Deb Barman Memorial Government Music College
 Government College of Art & Craft, Tripura
 Tripura Tribal Folk Music College
 Tripura State Academy of Tribal Culture
 National Forensic Science University Tripura Campus

General Degree Colleges
 Bir Bikram Memorial College
 Maharaja Bir Bikram College
 Women's College, Agartala
 Ramthakur College
 Iswar Chandra Vidyasagar College
 Kabi Nazrul Mahavidyalaya
 Dasaratha Deb Memorial College
 Netaji Subhash Mahavidyalaya, Udaipur
 Michael Madhusudan Dutta College
 Ambedkar College
 Adwaita Malla Barman Smriti Mahavidyalaya
 Swami Vivekananda Mahavidyalaya
 Government Degree College, Amarpur
 Government Degree College, Kamalpur
 Government Degree College, Dharmanagar
 Government Degree College, Santirbazer
 Government Degree College, Longtharai Valley
 Government Degree College, Teliamura
 Government General Degree College, Khumulwng
 Government Degree College, Kanchanpur
 Government Degree College, Gandacharra
 Rabindranath Thakur Mahavidyalaya, Bishalgarh
 Ramkrishna Mahavidyalaya
 Holy Cross College
 Bhavan’s Tripura College of Science and Technology
 Central Sanskrit University Ekalavya Campus

References

Higher Education Department Tripura

Tripura
Education in Tripura
Education